Ricardo Vicente Canals Vila (born 26 September 1970), is a Uruguayan former professional footballer who played as a centre-back

Career
Canals started his career in Bella Vista. He also played for Nacional, Huracan, Logrones, Vicenzo Calcio, Rosario Central, Fenix and the Uruguay national team.

References

External links
 

1970 births
Living people
Uruguayan footballers
Uruguay international footballers
Uruguayan expatriate footballers
Association football defenders
Uruguayan Primera División players
La Liga players
Serie A players
C.A. Bella Vista players
Club Nacional de Football players
CD Logroñés footballers
L.R. Vicenza players
Rosario Central footballers
Centro Atlético Fénix players
Uruguayan expatriate sportspeople in Argentina
Uruguayan expatriate sportspeople in Spain
Uruguayan expatriate sportspeople in Italy
Expatriate footballers in Argentina
Expatriate footballers in Spain
Expatriate footballers in Italy
Footballers from Montevideo